William A. McCleave (1825 – February 3, 1904) was an Irish-born American soldier and officer in the U.S. Army who served in the Indian Wars and the American Civil War.

Biography
William McCleave was born in northern Ireland in 1825. Losing his wife and child in the Great Famine; he immigrated to the United States in 1850. He went to California and enlisted in the 1st U.S. Regiment of Dragoons. He served in Company K under Captain James H. Carleton. Within the next decade he reached the rank of First Sergeant. In he 1861 served as camel herder for the United States Camel Corps and delivered 31 camels from Fort Tejon to Los Angeles.

After the American Civil War began McCleave was named Colonel and ordered to recruit a cavalry regiment in California. However only a battalion of five companies could be organized at that time and he was made a Captain in what would eventually become the 1st California Cavalry Regiment instead. He commanded Company A and established Camp Carleton before moving out to Arizona. There, on March 06, 1862, he was captured by Sherod Hunter and his Arizona Rangers. He was exchanged for two lieutenants four months later. He was promoted to major in January 1863 and spent the rest of the war fighting Indians in New Mexico. When in ended he was a Brevet Lieutenant Colonel and commanded Fort Sumner.

McCleave was mustered out on October 19th, 1866; commanding the regiment at that time. Having already accepted a commission in the Regular Army; he therefore became a Second Lieutenant in the 8th U.S. Cavalry. He retired in 1879 as a Captain. He had married Marry Crooke in 1872, eventually fathering six children, and after his retirement they settled in Berkeley, California. There he dealt real estate and commanded the Veterans Home of California Yountville. The freemason died on February  3, 1904. He was outlived by his widow, one daughter and his four sons (three of whom would serve in the army as well).

References

External links

1825 births
1904 deaths
19th-century Irish people
Irish emigrants to the United States (before 1923)
Irish soldiers in the United States Army
People of California in the American Civil War
Union Army officers
United States Army officers
American military personnel of the Indian Wars
Burials at San Francisco National Cemetery
People from Berkeley, California